Cyril Agodi Onwumechili (born 1932) is a Nigerian Professor of Physics and staff of the  University of Ibadan. He was the first Nigerian Geophysicist and the second President the Nigerian Academy of Science.
He was elected as President of the Academy in 1979 to succeeded Professor Victor Adenuga Oyenuga, first Emeritus Professor of the University of Ibadan and the first African Professor of Agricultural science.

Early life
Onwumechili was born in 1932 at Oji River, a city in Enugu State Eastern Nigeria. He attended King's College, Lagos and received a bachelor's degree in Physics from the University of London in 1953 and master's degree in physics from the University of Ibadan in 1954. He later received a Doctorate degree from the University of London.

Career
Onwumechili joined the Department of physics, University of Ibadan as academic staff. He was promoted to the rank of Professor in 1962 and appointed Head of the Department of Physics and Dean of Faculty of Science at Ibadan before he left in 1966 to join the services of the University of Nigeria, Nsukka as Head of the Department of Physics. During the Nigerian Civil War, he was appointed Acting Vice Chancellor of the University of Science and Technology, Port Harcourt. After the Civil War, he took over from Associate Prof. J.C. Ene as Dean of the Faculty of Science, University of Nigeria, from December 1970 - June 1971. In 1973, he was elected the first Dean of the Faculty of Physical Sciences, University of Nigeria, Nsukka, thrice elected (1973-1974; 1975-1976; October 1978- December 1978). Onwumechili left to become the Vice Chancellor, University of Ife (Now Obafemi Awolowo University, Ife).

References

External links 
 http://education.gov.ng/tertiary-education/ 
 https://www.kwcoeilorin.edu.ng/publications/staff_publications/taiwo_mb/history-of-education-in-nigeria-its-implication-to-educational-management-taiwo-mb-conf.pdf

1932 births
Living people
Fellows of the African Academy of Sciences
Fellows of the Nigerian Academy of Science
Nigerian physicists
Academic staff of the University of Ibadan
University of Ibadan alumni
Alumni of the University of London
King's College, Lagos alumni
Vice-Chancellors of Obafemi Awolowo University